The 2010 Brands Hatch Superleague Formula round was a Superleague Formula round, held on 1 August 2010 at the Brands Hatch circuit, Kent, England. It was Superleague Formula's first visit to the circuit and the second round of the 2010 season to be held in Britain, after the Silverstone round. It was the seventh round of the 2010 Superleague Formula season.

Eighteen clubs took part including English clubs Liverpool F.C. and Tottenham Hotspur. The other British SF club, Rangers F.C., were not competing that year.

Support races included the GT Cup, Formula Junior, and Lotus Cup Europe.

Report

Qualifying

Race 1

Race 2
The race was red-flagged with about nine minutes left to run due a very large crash involving Olympiacos' Chris van der Drift who was sent to hospital with a broken ankle, two broken ribs, a cracked shoulder blade, a dislocated shoulder and two broken fingers. He had run into the back of A.S. Roma's Julien Jousse just after Surtees' bend, they touched wheels which sent van der Drift's car into the air hitting the side barrier and bridge before spinning down Pilgrim's Drop, temporarily on fire, to a stop with the car seriously damaged and nearby racers narrowly avoiding the wreckage. Van der Drift remembered the accident and interviewed a few days later put it down to "a racing incident... I'm still alive, so that's good".

Super Final

Results

Qualifying
 In each group, the top four qualify for the quarter-finals.

Group A

Group B

Knockout stages

Grid

Race 1

Race 2

Super Final

Standings after the round

References

External links
 Official results from the Superleague Formula website

Brands Hatch
Superleague Formula Brands Hatch